Kapsha is a river in Tikhvinsky and Lodeynopolsky Districts in the northeastern part of Leningrad Oblast of Russia, a right tributary of the Pasha (Lake Ladoga basin). The Kapsha is the largest tributary of the Pasha.

The source of the Kapsha is in Lake Kapshozero in the northeast of Tikhvinsky District. The river flows west and enters Lodeynopolsky District. At the village of Pirozero it turns south and re-enters Tikhvinsky District. The mouth of the Kapsha is in the village of Ust-Kapsha.

The drainage basin of the Kapsha includes the northeast of Tikhvinsky District, the south of Lodeynopolsky District, as well as tiny areas in the south of Podporozhsky District and in the north of Boksitogorsky District. In particular, a number of mid-size lakes, including Lake Lerinskoye and Lake Muromozero, belong to the catchment area of Lake Kapshozero.

Until the 1990s, the Kapsha was used for log driving. It is a popular destination for kayaking.

See also
List of rivers of Russia
Vepsian Upland

References

Rivers of Leningrad Oblast